The red-faced warbler (Cardellina rubrifrons) is a species of New World warbler.

They are light gray on top with a white rump and a white underside. The face, neck, and upper breast are all bright red, while the crown and sides of the head are black. The spot on the back of the head where the black crown and gray back meet is sometimes speckled gray, or sometimes plain white. They have a quirky habit of flicking their tail sideways while feeding.

In summer they frequent northern Mexico and range up into the states of Arizona and New Mexico – the Madrean sky islands. In winter they migrate south into southern Mexico and the Central American nations of El Salvador, Guatemala, and Honduras. They are permanent residents of the central and southern mountains of western Mexico, the range called Sierra Madre Occidental.

The nest is a small cup constructed from leaves, grass, and pine needles. It is hidden amongst the debris on the forest floor, buried in the ground, sheltered under a shrub, log, or rock. The female lays 3 to 5 eggs, which are white spotted with brown. Incubation and nestling periods average 12 days each.

Gallery

References

 Curson, J., Quinn, D. & Beadle, D. (1994). New World Warblers. Helm.

Further reading

Book
 Martin, T. E., and P. M. Barber. 1995. Red-faced Warbler (Cardellina rubrifrons). In The Birds of North America, No. 152 (A. Poole and F. Gill, eds.). The Academy of Natural Sciences, Philadelphia, and The American Ornithologists’ Union, Washington, D.C.

Articles
 Barber PM, Martin TE & Smith KG. (1998). Pair interactions in Red-faced Warblers. Condor. vol 100, no 3. p. 512-518.
 Dobbs RC & Martin TR. (1998). Variation of foraging behavior among nesting stages of female Red-faced Warblers. Condor. vol 100, no 4. p. 741-745.
 Hellebuyck V. (1983). 3 New Specimen Records of Birds for El-Salvador. Wilson Bulletin. vol 95, no 4. p. 662-664.
 Lovette IJ & Hochachka WM. (2006). Simultaneous effects of phylogenetic niche conservatism and competition on avian community structure. Ecology. p. S) S14-S28, JUL 2006.
 Martin TE. (1996). Fitness costs of resource overlap among coexisting bird species. Nature. vol 380, no 6572. p. 338-340.
 Martin TE. (1998). Are microhabitat preferences of coexisting species under selection and adaptive?. Ecology. vol 79, no 2. p. 656-670.
 Martin TE & Barber PM. (1995). Red-faced Warbler Cardellina rubrifrons. Birds of North America. vol 0, no 152. p. 1-16.
 Martin TE, Scott J & Menge C. (2000). Nest predation increases with parental activity: Separating nest site and parental activity effects. Proceedings of the Royal Society Biological Sciences Series B. vol 267, no 1459. p. 2287-2293.
 McCaskie G. (1970). A Red-Faced Warbler Reaches California. California Birds. vol 1, no 4. p. 145-146.
 Palacios MG & Martin TE. (2006). Incubation period and immune function: a comparative field study among coexisting birds. Oecologia. vol 146, no 4. p. 505-512.
 Patricia MB, Thomas EM & Kimberly GS. (1998). Pair interactions in Red-faced Warblers. The Condor. vol 100, no 3. p. 512.
 Robert CD & Thomas EM. (1998). Variation in foraging behavior among nesting stages of female Red-faced Warblers. The Condor. vol 100, no 4. p. 741.
 Rusterholz KA. (1981). Competition and the Structure of an Avian Foraging Guild. American Naturalist. vol 118, no 2. p. 173-190.

External links
Red-faced warbler videos on the Internet Bird Collection
Red-faced warbler photo; Article firefly forest
Red-faced warbler photo gallery VIREO Photo-High Res--(Close-up)
Stamps (for El Salvador) with RangeMap
Photo-High Res

red-faced warbler
Native birds of the Southwestern United States
Fauna of the Chihuahuan Desert
Birds of Mexico
red-faced warbler
Birds of the Sierra Madre Occidental
Birds of the Sierra Madre del Sur
Birds of the Trans-Mexican Volcanic Belt